The Renault Tracer (R332A) is a class of buses produced by the bus division of Renault Trucks from 1991 to 2001.

The Tracer were in 2001 replaced by the Irisbus Arés.

Tracer